SGL may refer to:
 Same gender loving, an African-American term
 SGL Carbon, Germany
 SGL arena, Augsburg, Bavaria, Germany
Pennsylvania State Game Lands
Supergalactic longitude in the supergalactic coordinate system
 Sanglechi-Ishkashimi language, ISO 639-3 language code
 IATA code for Sangley Point Airport, Manila, Philippines
 Solar gravitational lens, a proposed method of using Sun's gravitational lensing as a large lens
 South Geelong railway station, Victoria, Australia, station code
 South Gyle railway station, station code

See also
 SGI (disambiguation)
 SG1 (disambiguation)
 SGML